Yenght: La Fuente de la Juventud is a Spanish interactive fiction game published in 1984 by Dinamic Software for the ZX Spectrum. It is written in BASIC. Yenght is the first game from Dinamic Software and the first graphic adventure game published in the Spanish market.

Gameplay
The game begins inside a maze where the player must first find a key and escape through the exit. Once outside, the player begins searching, but must be careful because outside there are several locations that connect with the labyrinth. The game also has rudimentary secondary characters, although perhaps due to programming error, it is possible to talk to them even after death.

Plot

The player's mission is to find the fountain of youth.

Development
The development process was both handmade and homemade - tapes were not manufactured until they had received enough orders to justify them ordering copies of the print covers and making duplicates of the cassette tapes. Originally they received a few tens of mail orders, but this later ballooned into several hundreds.

Reception
El Mundo Del Spectrum wrote that despite its simplicity, the game "overflowed with magic and charm". IGN recommended that players take out a paper and pencil to draw a map and avoid getting lost in the game's world.

Legacy
The game was featured as part of FX Museum's official launch celebrating 30 years of their company's video games - by this point, Dinamic Software had evolved into FX Interactive.

References 
 Microhobby 1,Microhobby 2, Microhobby 3

External links 
 
 Yenght at World of Spectrum
 

1984 video games
Adventure games
Dinamic Software games
Video games developed in Spain
ZX Spectrum games
ZX Spectrum-only games
Single-player video games